The Touristic Eastern Express is a scenic passenger train operated by the Turkish State Railways (TCDD). The train runs eastward  from Ankara Railway Station to Kars Railway Station. The train service debuted on 29 May 2019 with an official ceremony attended by government ministers. The service was established as an alternative to the regular Eastern Express, which runs the same line but was mostly sold-out weeks in advance in recent years for sightseeing purposes.

Overview
The Touristic Eastern Express departs from Ankara at 16:55 hours and arrives in Kars after 32 hours. Departure time in Kars is at 23:55 hours. It leaves Ankara on Mondays, Wednesdays and Fridays, and return from Kars is on Wednesdays, Fridays or Sundays. The train with nine cars, including six sleeping cars, one dining car, and two service cars, and has a capacity of 120 passengers. This train services suspended between 28 March 2020-15 December 2021 due the COVID-19 pandemic. In 15 December 2021 train restarted the operations from Ankara with an ceremony attended by Adil Karaismailoğlu the Minister of Transport and Infrastructure

Sightseeing stops
The train stops in the İliç town of Erzincan Province and Erzurum on the way from Ankara to Kars. On the return journey from Kars, it stops at the Divriği railway station and Bostankaya, both in Sivas Province.  Touristic excursions organized by the TCDD are offered to passengers during the two- to three-hour train stops. At the train stop in İliç, passengers are taken by bus to Kemaliye for a visit to the Karanlık Canyon and then to the water source of Lake Kadı, as well as to the historic wooden mansions. A boat ride on the reservoir of Bağıştaş 1 Dam in İliç is also offered. The passengers then travel by bus to Erzincan, where they visit the Ekşisu Picnic Area, the archaeological site of Altıntepe, and the Gürlevik Waterfalls. Outdoor recreational activities such as paragliding, rafting, and safari are offered. 

During a three-hour train stop in Erzurum, passengers are taken on a sightseeing tour by bus, visiting historic buildings such as the Rüstem Pasha Caravanserai (Taşhan), Erzurum Congress building, and Çifte Minareli Medrese. Tourist attractions visited on the way from Kars to Ankara are the Grand Mosque and Hospital in Divriği and Gök Medrese, the Grand Mosque of Sivas, Buruciye Medrese, and Çifte Minareli Medrese in Sivas.

Tickets
Tickets are priced at  1300 (approx. US$ 110) for a single-bed compartment.
All-inclusive onwards-and-return tour is priced at  2600 per person.

References

Named passenger trains of Turkey
Railway lines opened in 2019
2019 establishments in Turkey
Amusement rides based on rail transport
Tourism in Turkey